ŠK Javorník Makov is a Slovak association football club located in Makov. It currently plays in 3. liga (3rd tier in Slovak football system). The club was founded in 1933.

Notable players 
The following notable players had senior international caps for their respective countries. Players whose name is listed in bold represented their countries while playing for Javorník Makov. 

 Viktor Pečovský

External links
Futbalnet profile 
Official club website

References

Football clubs in Slovakia
Association football clubs established in 1933
1933 establishments in Slovakia